Berka/Werra (also Berka an der Werra) is a town and a former municipality in the Wartburgkreis district, in Thuringia, Germany. Since 1 January 2019, it is part of the town Werra-Suhl-Tal. It is situated on the river Werra, 19 km west of Eisenach.

Within the former municipality there are the following municipal districts:
Berka/Werra city center
Fernbreitenbach
Gospenroda
Herda (with Hausbreitenbach and Kratzeroda)
Horschlitt (with Auenheim-Rienau)
Vitzeroda (with Abteroda and Gasteroda)
Wünschensuhl

History
Within the German Empire (1871-1918), Berka/Werra was part of the Grand Duchy of Saxe-Weimar-Eisenach.

References

Wartburgkreis
Former municipalities in Thuringia